Francesco Orlando may refer to:

 Francesco Orlando (critic) (1934–2010), Italian literary critic
 Francesco Orlando (footballer) (born 1995), Italian football player